The Cremeneț is a left tributary of the river Șușița in Romania. It discharges into the Șușița in Rotileștii Mici.

References

 Soare, Ionica - Proiect Valea Șușiței

Rivers of Romania
Rivers of Vrancea County